Symphony No.1 In Memoriam to the Martyrs of Babi Yar was written by the Ukrainian composer of Jewish descent Dmitri Klebanov in 1945. It is a commemoration of the massacre of the Jews in Babi Yar, Ukraine, during the Holocaust. 

The symphony was based on Jewish traditional tunes. In particular, its finale was a variation of  "The Mourner's Kaddish" prayer. The symphony was quickly forbidden (as part of the Soviet regime's effort to stop  Jewish commemoration activities) and the composer was stripped of the position of Chairman of the Kharkiv chapter of the Union of Soviet Composers. Klebanov was accused of "distortion of historical truth about the Soviet people" (the official Soviet party line was that those perished during the war were all Soviet people, and singling out particular ethnicities was forbidden), "bourgeois formalism" and "cosmopolitanism" and there were even efforts to accuse him of anti-Soviet activities. 

For the first time the symphony was performed in 1990, posthumously.

See also
Symphony No. 13 (Shostakovich), subtitled "Babi Yar"

References

Babi Yar
Songs about the Holocaust
1945 compositions
Classical music about the Holocaust